Prvi splitski odred is a Croatian film directed by Vojdrag Berčić. It was released in 1972.
It is based on true events from the very beginning of the Second World War in Dalmatia.

References

External links
 

1972 films
1970s Croatian-language films
Croatian war films
1972 war films
War films set in Partisan Yugoslavia
Croatian World War II films
Yugoslav World War II films